Jürgen Oesten (24 October 1913 – 5 August 2010) was a Korvettenkapitän in the Kriegsmarine during World War II.

Career
Born in Grunewald, Berlin, Oesten joined the Reichsmarine in April 1933.

World War II

U-61
In August 1939 Oesten commissioned , sailing on nine patrols, and sinking five ships.

U-106
On 20 March 1941 during an attack on convoy SL-68 he damaged the British battleship .

9th Flotilla
In October 1941 Oesten became the first commander of the 9th U-boat Flotilla based in Brest, France. In March 1942 he joined the staff of FdU Nordmeer directing the U-boat war in the Norwegian Sea.

U-861
He sank another two ships, bringing his career total to 19 ships sunk, totalling , and four ships damaged, before reaching Penang on 23 September 1944. U-861 left Soerabaya, Dutch East Indies, in January 1945 carrying a cargo of vital materials, but only two torpedoes, and reached Trondheim, Norway, in April, just before the German surrender.

Post War
Oesten was a technical advisor for the 2005 submarine simulator Silent Hunter III.

Awards 
 U-Boat War Badge
 Wehrmacht Long Service Award, 4th class
 Spanish Cross in bronze without swords (6 June 1939)
 Iron Cross (1939)
 2nd Class (3 December 1939)
 1st Class (27 February 1940)
Sudetenland Medal (20 December 1939)
 Knight's Cross of the Iron Cross on 26 March 1941 as Kapitänleutnant and commander of U-106

References

Notes

Bibliography

External links

1913 births
2010 deaths
People from Charlottenburg-Wilmersdorf
U-boat commanders (Kriegsmarine)
Recipients of the Knight's Cross of the Iron Cross
German military personnel of the Spanish Civil War
Reichsmarine personnel
Military personnel from Berlin